"Mister Fire Eyes" is a song written by Ned Miller and Bonnie Guitar. It was released as a single by Bonnie Guitar in July 1957. The single became her second major hit as a music artist, peaking at #15 on the Billboard Magazine Hot Country Singles chart and #71 on the Billboard Hot 100. "Mister Fire Eyes" was not initially released on a formal record album.

Chart performance

References 

1957 singles
Bonnie Guitar songs
1957 songs
Dot Records singles
Songs written by Ned Miller